LCCE may refer to:

 Lamaze-certified childbirth educator
 Lee County Central Electric Railway
 London Chinese Children’s Ensemble